The Governor of Misiones Province is the chief executive of Misiones, one of the federal Provinces of Argentina. This office is elected by the popular vote of the province for term of four years. Since 10 December 2019, the governor has been Oscar Herrera Ahuad of the Party of Social Concord.

Governors since 1983

See also
 Chamber of Representatives of Misiones

References

 
Misiones Province
Misiones Province